Good Company may refer to:

"Good Company" (Queen song), a song on Queen's 1975 album A Night at the Opera
"Good Company" (Jake Owen song), a song on Jake Owen's 2016 album American Love
"Good Company", a song from Disney film Oliver & Company
Good Company, a 2014 album by Canadian folk group The Dead South
Good Company (company), a US film production company
Good Company (TV series), an American sitcom aired in 1996

See also
In Good Company (disambiguation)
"Pastime with Good Company", a song written by King Henry VIII of England